Messerschmitt-Bölkow-Blohm (MBB) was a West German aerospace manufacturer. It was formed during the late 1960s as the result of efforts to consolidate the West German aerospace industry; aircraft manufacturer Messerschmitt AG merged with the civil engineering and aviation firm Bölkow during 1968, while rival aircraft manufacturer Hamburger Flugzeugbau was acquired by the company in the following year.

The company was responsible for the development and manufacture of various aircraft during its existence. Among its best-known products was the MBB Bo 105 light twin-engine helicopter and its enlarged derivative, the MBB/Kawasaki BK 117. MBB was also a key early partner on the Airbus A300, a wide-body twin-jet airliner; the company's involvement in the A300's development and production led to it forming a key component of the multinational Airbus consortium. It was also involved in numerous experimental aircraft programmes, such as the MBB Lampyridae, an aborted stealth aircraft.

The ownership and assets of MBB changed drastically throughout its roughly two decades of existence. The company was bought by Deutsche Aerospace AG (DASA) during 1989; following several mergers and restructures, the assets of what was MBB presently form a part of Airbus Group.

History

On 6 June 1968, Messerschmitt AG merged with the small civil engineering and civil aviation firm Bölkow, becoming Messerschmitt-Bölkow. The following May, the firm acquired Hamburger Flugzeugbau (HFB), which had originated as a branch of Blohm+Voss. To reflect the latter's acquisition, the company changed its name to Messerschmitt-Bölkow-Blohm (MBB). Upon its formation, 51% of the shares in MBB was owned by the Blohm family, Willy Messerschmitt and Ludwig Bölkow; 22.07% was owned by the German State of Hamburg, 17.05% by the state of Bavaria, 7.16% by Thyssen AG, 7.16% by Siemens AG, 7.13% by Allianz Versicherungs-AG, 7.13% by Robert Bosch GmbH and 6.15% by Friedrich Krupp GmbH.

Perhaps the most successful product produced primarily by MBB was the Bo 105 helicopter. This rotorcraft, the design of which was headed by German engineer Ludwig Bölkow, made use of a revolutionary hingeless main rotor composed of fibreglass. On 13 October 1970, the German Civil Aviation Authority certified the Bo 105; initial deliveries for the first customers, ADAC Air Rescue and the Bavarian State Police, took place shortly thereafter. During 1972, an improved version of the rotorcraft with more powerful engines, the Bo 105C, was developed, this model quickly superseded the Bo 105A. Following its introduction to service in 1970, the Bo 105 quickly proved to be a commercial success. Production continued until 2001; by the end of production, 1,406 rotorcraft had been manufactured and delivered to operators in 55 nations worldwide. It served as the basis for several derivatives, such as the MBB/Kawasaki BK 117.

Having established a reputation for reliability and safety, MBB, along with one of its major shareholders, Boeing Vertol, began studying options during the 1970s for producing an enlarged version to accompany the Bo 105. However, Boeing withdrew from the venture, leading to MBB search for another partner; this was found in the form of Japanese company Kawasaki Heavy Industries. On 25 February 1977, MBB and Kawasaki signed an agreement to cooperate on the development of a new rotorcraft. Under the terms of this agreement, the two corporations merged their previously separate projects to produce twin-engined general purpose helicopters, these being the Bo 107 by MBB and the KH-7 from Kawasaki. Separate elements were assigned to each company; MBB were responsible for developing the rotors (these were based on the rigid rotor system previously used on MBB's Bo 105), tailboom, flight controls and hydraulic system while Kawasaki undertook the development of the landing gear, airframe, main transmission, electrical system and other minor components. Each company established their own final assembly line for the type, on which they produced the rotorcraft to meet demands within their respective local markets.

An even more advanced derivative of the Bo 105, initially designated by MBB as the Bo 108 begun development during the 1970s. The company developed it in partnership with France's Aérospatiale; the Bo 108 was originally intended to be a technology demonstrator, combining attributes of the successful Bo 105 with new advances and an aerodynamically streamlined design. Technologies included the first full-authority digital engine controls (FADEC) on a helicopter, a hingeless main rotor, and the adoption of a new transmission. First flown on 17 October 1988, a production version was introduced as the Eurocopter EC135 during the early 1990s which, like its Bo 105 ancestor, achieved similar commercial success.

Perhaps the most important partnership that MBB was involved in was the Airbus A300. On 26 September 1967, the British, French, and West German governments signed a Memorandum of Understanding to start development of the A300. At this point, the A300 was only the second major joint aircraft programme in Europe, the first being the Anglo-French Concorde. Under the terms of the memorandum, Britain and France were each to receive a 37.5 per cent work share on the project, while Germany received a 25 per cent share. France's Sud Aviation was recognized as the lead company for A300, while Hawker Siddeley was selected as the British partner company. On 29 May 1969, during the Paris Air Show, French transport minister Jean Chamant and German economics minister Karl Schiller signed an agreement officially launching the Airbus A300, the world's first twin-engine widebody airliner. The project intended to produce an aircraft that was smaller, lighter, and more economical than its three-engine American rivals, the McDonnell Douglas DC-10 and the Lockheed L-1011 TriStar.

Shortly after the Paris Air Show agreement, it was decided that, to provide effective management of responsibilities, a Groupement d'intérêt économique would be established, allowing the various partners to work together on the project while remaining separate business entities; this would be the origins of the Airbus Group. On 18 December 1970, Airbus Industrie was formally established following an agreement between Aérospatiale (the newly merged Sud Aviation and Nord Aviation) of France and the antecedents to Deutsche Aerospace of Germany, each receiving a 50 per cent stake in the newly formed company. On 15 March 1974, type certificates were granted for the A300 from both German and French authorities, clearing the way for its entry into revenue service. Ten years after the official launch of the A300, the company had achieved a 26 per cent market share in terms of dollar value, enabling Airbus Industries to proceed with the development of its second aircraft, the Airbus A310.

During 1981, MBB acquired rival company Vereinigte Flugtechnische Werke (VFW), which itself had been formed via the merger of the aircraft manufacturers Focke-Wulf, Focke-Achgelis, and Weserflug. During the following year, MBB acquired the astronautics company Entwicklungsring Nord (ERNO; to reflect this change, the company was rebranded as MBB-ERNO. In 1989, MBB was taken over by Deutsche Aerospace AG (DASA), which was renamed "Daimler-Benz Aerospace" during 1995. Following the 1998 merger of German industrial group Daimler Benz and the American company Chrysler Corporation, the aerospace division was renamed DaimlerChrysler Aerospace AG on 7 November 1998. As part of the prevailing trend of European defense consolidation of the late 1990s saw DASA being merged with Aerospatiale-Matra of France and Construcciones Aeronáuticas SA (CASA) of Spain to form the European Aeronautic Defence and Space Company (EADS) during 2000. The former assets of the DaimlerChrysler Aerospace, for the most part, presently operate as "Airbus Germany".

Subsidiaries
 MBB-Liftsystems AG, which produces lifting systems for trucks and vans
 MBB-Sondertechnik (today FHS Förder– und Hebesysteme GmbH), developed wind rotors in the 1980s and 1990s, and lifting systems for military use. 
 MBB Gelma GmbH, produces timekeeping units and machine control units (today owned by DORMA KG)
 MBB Group AG

Aircraft

 MBB Lampyridae
 MBB Bo 102
 MBB Bo 103
 MBB Bo 105
 MBB Bo 106
 MBB Bo 108 - became the Eurocopter EC 135
 MBB Bo 115
 MBB Bo 209
 MBB/Kawasaki BK 117
 MBB 223 Flamingo
 MBB/Hamburger Flugzeugbau HFB-320 Hansa Jet
 MBB F-104G/CCV (CCV Program)

Partnerships

 Airbus A300
 Airbus A310
 Airbus A320 family
 Eurofighter Typhoon
 Panavia Tornado
 Rockwell-MBB X-31
 Transall C-160
 MPC 75

Missiles
 AS.34 Kormoran
 Cobra (missile)

Partnerships
 HOT (missile)
 MILAN
 Roland (missile)

Space hardware

Unmanned spacecraft
 Helios (spacecraft)
 Symphonie
 EURECA

Manned spacecraft
 Spacelab
 Saenger (spacecraft)

Other
MBTA BTC-3 and CTC-3
DB Class 420 commuter trains
DB ICE 1 high-speed trains
Alpenflug, a suspended roller coaster

References

Citations

General sources 

 "BK 117...a Terrestrial Space Ship". Air International, Vol. 36, No. 4, April 1989. Bromley, UK: Fine Scroll. . pp. 163–170.
 Bowen, John T. The Economic Geography of Air Transportation: Space, Time, and the Freedom of the Sky. Business & Economics, 2010. .
 
 
 McCellan, J. Mac. "Paramedic". Flying, February 1986. Vol. 113, No. 2. pp. 62–67. .
 Pitt, Ivan L. and John Randolph Norsworthy. Economics of the U.S. Commercial Airline Industry: Productivity, Technology and Deregulation. Springer, 2012. .
 Senguttuvan, P. S. Fundamentals of Air Transport Management. Excel Books India, 2006. .
 Simons, Graham. The Airbus A380: A History. Pen and Sword, 2014. .

External links

 Airbus Group
 MBB Industries AG
 MBB Group AG
 MBB Projects GmbH
 MBB and Eurocopter history
 MBB Palfinger GmbH
 About Daimler-Benz Aerospace
 MBB KOMET, the first high-speed maglev
 Airbus Group: Aerospace pioneer Ludwig Bölkow

Aerospace companies of Germany
Aircraft manufacturers of Germany
Companies based in Bavaria
Defence companies of Germany
Defunct motor vehicle manufacturers of Germany
Helicopter manufacturers of Germany
Messerschmitt